Seobu Library is a public library in Seo-gu, Daegu, South Korea. The total number of books in the library is 247,059, and that of paper is 6,721. The library opened on 23 December 1992.

References
http://www.seobu-lib.daegu.kr/content/07intro/01_01.php

1992 establishments in South Korea
Library buildings completed in 1992
Libraries in Daegu
Seo District, Daegu
Libraries established in 1992